HBase is an open-source non-relational distributed database modeled after Google's Bigtable and written in Java. It is developed as part of Apache Software Foundation's Apache Hadoop project and runs on top of HDFS (Hadoop Distributed File System) or Alluxio, providing Bigtable-like capabilities for Hadoop. That is, it provides a fault-tolerant way of storing large quantities of sparse data (small amounts of information caught within a large collection of empty or unimportant data, such as finding the 50 largest items in a group of 2 billion records, or finding the non-zero items representing less than 0.1% of a huge collection).

HBase features compression, in-memory operation, and Bloom filters on a per-column basis as outlined in the original Bigtable paper. Tables in HBase can serve as the input and output for MapReduce jobs run in Hadoop, and may be accessed through the Java API but also through REST, Avro or Thrift gateway APIs. HBase is a wide-column store and has been widely adopted because of its lineage with Hadoop and HDFS. HBase runs on top of HDFS and is well-suited for fast read and write operations on large datasets with high throughput and low input/output latency.

HBase is not a direct replacement for a classic SQL database, however Apache Phoenix project provides a SQL layer for HBase as well as JDBC driver that can be integrated with various analytics and business intelligence applications.  The Apache Trafodion project provides a SQL query engine with ODBC and JDBC drivers and distributed ACID transaction protection across multiple statements, tables and rows that use HBase as a storage engine.

HBase is now serving several data-driven websites but Facebook's Messaging Platform migrated from HBase to MyRocks in 2018. Unlike relational and traditional databases, HBase does not support SQL scripting; instead the equivalent is written in Java, employing similarity with a MapReduce application.

In the parlance of Eric Brewer's CAP Theorem, HBase is a CP type system.

History
Apache HBase began as a project by the company Powerset out of a need to process massive amounts of data for the purposes of natural-language search. Since 2010 it is a top-level Apache project.

Facebook elected to implement its new messaging platform using HBase in November 2010, but migrated away from HBase in 2018.

The 2.2.z series is the current stable release line, it supersedes earlier release lines.

Use cases & production deployments

Enterprises that use HBase 
The following is a list of notable enterprises that have used or are using HBase:

 23andMe
 Adobe
 Airbnb uses HBase as part of its AirStream realtime stream computation framework
 Alibaba Group
 Amadeus IT Group, as its main long-term storage DB.
 Bloomberg, for time series data storage
 Facebook used HBase for its messaging platform between 2010 and 2018
 Flipkart uses HBase for its search index and user insights.
 Flurry
 HubSpot 
 Imgur uses HBase to power its notifications system
 Kakao
 Netflix
 Pinterest
 Quicken Loans
 Rocket Fuel 
 Salesforce.com
 Sears
 Sophos, for some of their back-end systems.
 Spotify uses HBase as base for Hadoop and machine learning jobs. 
 Twitter
 Tuenti uses HBase for its messaging platform.
 Xiaomi
 Yahoo!

See also

 NoSQL
 Wide column store
 Bigtable
 Apache Cassandra
 Oracle NOSQL
 Hypertable
 Apache Accumulo
 MongoDB
 Project Voldemort
 Riak
 Sqoop
 Elasticsearch
 Apache Phoenix

References

Bibliography

External links
Official Apache HBase homepage

HBase
Bigtable implementations
Hadoop
Free database management systems
NoSQL
Structured storage